Randsfjorden is Norway's fourth-largest lake with an area of . It is located in Innlandet and Viken counties in the municipalities of Gran, Jevnaker, Nordre Land, and Søndre Land in the districts of Land and Hadeland. It is drained by the Randselva river. 

In Heimskringla, Snorri Sturluson recorded that Halfdan the Black (Halvdan Svarte), father of Harald Hårfagre, the first King of Norway, journeyed over the lake while returning home from a visit to Hadeland. Traveling with a horse and sleigh while the lake was supposedly frozen, he fell through the ice and drowned.

In modern times, many golf courses have been set up on the edge of the lake. The Tangen–Horn ferry runs between Horn on the east bank and Tangen on the west, which is Norway's last remaining and regularly operating car ferry connection on an inland lake. The sightseeing boat MS Kong Haud sails on the Randsfjorden from Jevnaker to Odnes.

Name
The Old Norse form of the name was just Rǫnd, derived from the word rǫnd which means "stripe" or "edge" (referring to the long and narrow form of the lake). The last element -fjorden (the finite form of fjord) is a later addition to the name that was first recorded in 1691. Although the term "fjord" usually describes a saltwater inlet that is connected to the ocean, the Randsfjorden is actually a freshwater lake with a narrow shape, approximately aligned on a north–south axis.

See also
List of lakes in Norway

References

Hadeland
Land, Norway
Nordre Land
Søndre Land
Gran, Norway
Jevnaker
Lakes of Innlandet
Lakes of Viken (county)